Thomas Anderton Wiseman Jr. (November 3, 1930 – March 18, 2020) was a United States district judge of the United States District Court for the Middle District of Tennessee from 1978 to 1995.

Education and career
Born in Tullahoma, Tennessee, the son of Vera Seleta (Poe) and Thomas Anderton Wiseman, Wiseman received a Bachelor of Arts degree from Vanderbilt University in 1952, and a Juris Doctor from Vanderbilt University Law School in 1954. He was in the United States Army from 1954 to 1956, and then entered private practice in Tullahoma from 1956 to 1963, and in Winchester, Tennessee from 1963 to 1971. He was a member of the Tennessee House of Representatives from 1965 to 1969, and was the Treasurer of the State of Tennessee from 1971 to 1974. He ran for the Democratic Party nomination for Governor in 1974 amid a crowded field of candidates and was badly outspent by both eventual nominee and winner Ray Blanton and runner-up Jake Butcher. Wiseman then resumed his private practice, this time in Nashville, Tennessee from 1974 to 1978.

Federal judicial service
On August 1, 1978, Wiseman was nominated by President Jimmy Carter to a seat on the United States District Court for the Middle District of Tennessee vacated by Judge Frank Gray Jr. Wiseman was confirmed by the United States Senate on August 11, 1978, and received his commission the same day. He served as Chief Judge from 1984 to 1991, and assumed senior status on November 3, 1995. At the time of his death, he was in inactive senior status.

Further education and service
Wiseman served as an adjunct faculty member at Vanderbilt University Law School from 1989–2020, and received a Master of Laws from the University of Virginia School of Law in 1990. He was a Special Master for the Sixth Circuit Court of Appeals from 1992–1993.

Death
He died on March 18, 2020, in Nashville, Tennessee at age 89.

References

Sources
 

1930 births
2020 deaths
Judges of the United States District Court for the Middle District of Tennessee
Democratic Party members of the Tennessee House of Representatives
People from Tullahoma, Tennessee
Military personnel from Tennessee
State treasurers of Tennessee
United States district court judges appointed by Jimmy Carter
20th-century American judges
Vanderbilt University Law School alumni
United States Army personnel
University of Virginia School of Law alumni
Vanderbilt University Law School faculty